Edward Faraday Odlum (November 27, 1850 – May 4, 1935) was a Canadian geologist, educator and businessman. He studied the ethnography of the people of Australia and Northern Europe, and investigated the Stone of Scone. He was a believer in British Israelism.

Biography
He was born at Tullamore, Ontario on November 27, 1850. He attended the University of Toronto and graduated in 1883. He taught at Coburg Collegiate. He then became the principal of the Pembroke High School. He moved to Japan and became the principal of a Methodist College in Tokyo from 1886 to 1889.

He returned to Canada in 1889 and lived in Vancouver. Odlum may have installed the first public telephone in Vancouver and the first electric arc light. He was elected as an alderman twice, first in 1892. He visited the United Kingdom from 1903 to 1904 to promote migration to Canada.  He ran for a seat in the British Columbia legislature but was defeated.

He died on May 4, 1935 in Vancouver, British Columbia, Canada.

Stone of Scone
Odlum made microscopic examinations of the Stone of Scone, comparing it to similar stone from Scotland (including Iona and the quarries of Ireland) and found them dissimilar, and intrigued with the idea of a Palestine source investigated and discovered a stratum of sandstone near Bethel, a geological match.  A series of requests were made by him for a sample of the Coronation Stone for more rigorous chemical tests, but all were denied.  Identification of the original Bethel is also an issue. .

A lesser folk legend holds that Robert the Bruce gave a portion of the stone to Cormac McCarthy, king of Munster, in gratitude for Irish support at the Battle of Bannockburn (1314). Installed at McCarthy's stronghold, Blarney Castle, it became the Blarney Stone. Although colourful, this folk legend cannot be true if the stone was removed from Scotland 18 years before Bannockburn.  Some people think that the stone which Edward removed was not the true stone as it did not well match existing descriptions such as not being hollowed out. In that case, a false replacement stone would probably have been local stone. There is no evidence one way or the other on this.

Legacy
Odlum was the father of soldier and diplomat Victor Wentworth Odlum. A street in Grandview, Odlum Drive, is named after Edward Odlum.

References

Canadian geologists
Canadian archaeologists
1850 births
1935 deaths
People from Brampton
University of Toronto alumni
British Israelism